Pasha is a rural locality in the Isaac Region, Queensland, Australia. In the  Pasha had a population of 50 people.

History 
Pasha State School opened on 22 May 1975 and closed on 9 December 1977.

In the  Pasha had a population of 50 people.

References 

Isaac Region
Localities in Queensland